Justin D. Ready (born April 15, 1982) is member of the Maryland State Senate and a former member of the Maryland House of Delegates.

Background
Justin Ready was born in Mobile, Alabama, but moved to Westminster, Maryland at the age of 11 after living in Mississippi.

Senator Ready attends Liberty Church in Westminster, Maryland where his father is a pastor. His mother is a public school teacher.

Education
Justin Ready received an Associate of Arts degree from Carroll Community College and graduated from Salisbury University in 2004 with a bachelor's degree in political science and minor in history. He received a Master's of Business Administration from University of Maryland, University College in 2018.

Career
After college, Ready was a legislative aide to Delegate J. B. Jennings from 2004 until 2006. In 2004, he also served as a field director for E.J. Pipkin during Pipkin's unsuccessful run for U.S. Senate against Barbara Mikulski.  In 2006 he became Chief of Staff to Senator Janet Greenip, a position he held until 2008.  Additionally, Ready has worked as a self-employed small business owner specializing in printing design, marketing, management, and advertising. He was a Huckabee for President delegate and served as the grassroots chairman for that campaign in Maryland.

Prior to being elected to the Maryland House of Delegates, Ready served as executive director of the Maryland Republican Party from 2008 until 2009. He also served as interim Executive Director from July–December 2011.

In January 2015, Ready resigned his House of Delegates seat in order to accept an appointment from Governor Larry Hogan to the State Senate seat in District 5, vacated by Joseph M. Getty, who took a position with the Governor's staff.  The appointment was controversial as the Carroll County Republican Central Committee originally only submitted one name for the vacated State Senate seat, that of former Carroll County Commissioner Robin Bartlett Frazier, who was defeated in the Republican primary election in her bid for reelection to the said Commissioner seat.  Governor Hogan rejected the submitted name and requested three names from which he could choose.  Three names were later submitted, that of Robin Bartlett Frazier again, Delegate Ready, and Dave Wallace who had unsuccessfully run for several political positions in the past.

Legislative career
During his time in the Maryland House of Delegates, Ready was a founding member of the organization "Change Maryland" which became the largest non-partisan advocacy group in the state. Change Maryland was led by now-Governor Larry Hogan. He also served as Maryland Co-Chair of the Rick Perry Presidential Campaign in the early 2012 presidential primary season.

In November 2014, Ready was appointed to Governor-Elect Larry Hogan's Transition Team where he worked on state agency review and analysis.

In the House of Delegates, Ready served as Chief Deputy Whip, a position he was appointed to by Minority Leader Nic Kipke and Minority Whip Kathy Szeliga in 2013. He was a member of the Health and Government Operations Committee and the Rural Health-Care Work Group. He served on two sub-committees - Government Operations and Minority Health Disparities.

In the Senate, Ready serves on the Judicial Proceedings Committee and, as the only resident State Senator in Carroll County, is the chairman of the three-member Carroll Senate Delegation.

Ready served as an assistant football coach at North Carroll High School in 2012 and 2013.

Ready is a supporter for Alpha Pregnancy Centers, the Fellowship of Christian Athletes and leads worship at Liberty Church in Westminster, MD.

Election results
2022 Race for Maryland House of Delegates – District 5
Voters to choose three:
{| class="wikitable"
|-
!Name
!Votes
!Percent
!Outcome
|-
|- 
|Justin Ready, Rep.
|39,484
|  96.1%
|   Won
|-
|Other Write-Ins
|1,598
|  3.8% 
|   Lost
|-
|}

2018 Race for Maryland House of Delegates – District 5
Voters to choose three:
{| class="wikitable"
|-
!Name
!Votes
!Percent
!Outcome
|-
|- 
|Justin Ready, Rep.
|39,568
|  71.5%
|   Won
|-
|- 
|Jamie O'Marr, Rep.
|15,739
|  28.4%
|   Lost
|-
|Other Write-Ins
|63
|  0.1% 
|   Lost
|-
|}

2014 Race for Maryland House of Delegates – District 5
Voters to choose three:
{| class="wikitable"
|-
!Name
!Votes
!Percent
!Outcome
|-
|- 
|Susan Krebs, Rep.
|35,701
|  28.6%
|   Won
|-
|- 
|Justin Ready, Rep.
|34,789
|  27.9%
|   Won
|-
|- 
|Haven Shoemaker, Rep.
|33,985
|  27.2%
|   Won
|-
|-
|Dorothy G. Scanlan, Dem.
|11,737
|  9.4%
|   Lost
|-
|-
|Zachary Hands, Dem.
|8,210
|  6.6%
|   Lost
|-
|Other Write-Ins
|351
|  0.3% 
|   Lost
|-
|}

2010 Race for Maryland House of Delegates – District 5A
Voters to choose two:
{| class="wikitable"
|-
!Name
!Votes
!Percent
!Outcome
|-
|- 
|Justin Ready, Rep.
|21,226
|  38.4%
|   Won
|-
|- 
|Nancy R. Stocksdale, Rep.
|19,046
|  34.4%
|   Won
|-
|-
|Francis X. Walsh, Dem.
|7,688
|  13.9%
|   Lost
|-
|-
|Sharon L. Baker, Dem.
|7,250
|  13.1%
|   Lost
|-
|Other Write-Ins
|110
|  0.2% 
|   Lost
|-
|}

References

1982 births
21st-century American politicians
Alabama Republicans
Living people
Maryland Republicans
Maryland state senators
Members of the Maryland House of Delegates
People from Westminster, Maryland
Politicians from Mobile, Alabama
Salisbury University alumni